Tony Brown (born August 8, 1997) is an American football wide receiver who is currently a member of the Hamilton Tiger-Cats of the Canadian Football League (CFL). He played college football at Texas Tech and Colorado, and signed with the Cleveland Browns as an undrafted free agent in 2020. He has also been a member of the New York Giants and Washington Football Team.

College career
Brown began his collegiate career at Texas Tech. He played for the Red Raiders for two seasons and caught 27 passes for 378 yards and a touchdown in 24 games played. After his sophomore season, Brown announced his intent to transfer from Texas Tech and ultimately transferred to the University of Colorado.

After sitting out one year due to NCAA transfer rules, Brown finished third on the team with 32 receptions and 333 receiving yards along with one touchdown in his first season playing for the Buffaloes. As a redshirt senior, he led the team with 55 catches, 698 receiving yards and five touchdown receptions.

Professional career

Cleveland Browns
Brown was signed by the Cleveland Browns as an undrafted free agent on April 25, 2020. He was waived by the Browns on July 31, 2020.

New York Giants
Brown was claimed off waivers by the New York Giants on August 1, 2020, but was waived on August 27, 2020.

Washington Football Team
Brown was signed by the Washington Football Team on August 31, 2020. He was waived during final roster cuts and was re-signed to the team's practice squad on September 6, 2020, before being promoted to the active roster on October 24, 2020. He was waived on November 9, 2020. On January 11, 2021, Brown signed a reserve/futures contract with Washington. Brown was released on August 31, 2021.

Hamilton Tiger-Cats 
On August 10, 2022, Brown signed with the Hamilton Tiger-Cats of the Canadian Football League (CFL).

References

External links
Washington Football Team bio
Colorado Buffaloes bio

1997 births
Living people
Players of American football from California
Sportspeople from Los Angeles County, California
American football wide receivers
Colorado Buffaloes football players
People from La Mirada, California
Washington Football Team players
Texas Tech Red Raiders football players